Rokeby is the name of:

People 
 Baron Rokeby, an Irish title
 Rokeby baronets, a British title

Places

Australia
 Rokeby, Tasmania, a suburb of Hobart
 Rokeby, Victoria, a town in West Gippsland

Canada
 Rokeby, Lambton County, Ontario, a community in Brooke-Alvinston
 Rokeby, Ontario, name of the townsite that became Bobcaygeon
 Rokeby, Saskatchewan, a town

England
 Rokeby, County Durham, the location of Rokeby Park
Rokeby is a historic name for Rugby, Warwickshire, and a name for a suburb of the town

New Zealand
 Rokeby, New Zealand, a locality in the Ashburton District

United States
Rokeby, Nebraska, an unincorporated community
 Rokeby (Barrytown, New York), listed on the National Register of Historic Places in Dutchess County, New York
Rokeby Lock, Ohio, unincorporated community in Morgan County
 Rokeby (Ferrisburg, Vermont), a house in the underground railway and a national historic landmark, listed on the NRHP in Addison County, Vermont
 Rokeby (King George, Virginia), listed on the National Register of Historic Places in King George County, Virginia
 Rokeby (Leesburg, Virginia), listed on the National Register of Historic Places in Loudoun County, Virginia

Schools
 Rokeby High School, public high school, Hobart, Tasmania
 Rokeby Preparatory School, all-male preparatory day school, Kingston upon Thames, London, England
 Rokeby School, all-male community secondary school, Newham, England

Other uses
 "Rokeby" (poem), an 1813 poem by Sir Walter Scott
 Rokeby Airport (RKY), an airport in Queensland, Australia
 Rokeby Collection, a collection of photographs of UK railway stations
 Rokeby Park, a country house in County Durham, England